The Iren is a river in Perm Krai, Russia, a left tributary of the Sylva.
It starts near village Verh-Iren, in Oktyabrsky District and flows through Uinsky, Ordinsky and Kungursky districts of Perm Krai.

Main tributaries:
Left: Uyas, Aspa, Syp, Bym, Bolshoy Ashap, Maly Ashap, Turka
Right: Telyos, Kungur.

References

External links 
Iren in encyclopedia of Perm Krai

Rivers of Perm Krai